Bonaire (almost pronounced ) is a Dutch island in the Leeward Antilles in the Caribbean Sea. Its capital is the port of Kralendijk, on the west (leeward) coast of the island. Aruba, Bonaire and Curaçao form the ABC islands, 80 km (50 miles) off the coast of Venezuela. Unlike much of the Caribbean region, the ABC islands lie outside Hurricane Alley. The islands have an arid climate that attracts visitors seeking warm, sunny weather all year round. Bonaire is a popular snorkeling and scuba diving destination because of its multiple shore diving sites and easy access to the island's fringing reefs.

As of 1 January 2022, the island's population totaled 22,573 permanent residents, an increase of nearly 6000 since 2012. Klein Bonaire has low-growing vegetation including cactus (Papiamento: kadushi), with sparse palm trees near the water and is bordered by white sandy beaches and a fringing reef. The reefs, beaches and on-island reserves located on both Bonaire and Klein Bonaire are under the protection of the Bonaire National Marine Park, and managed by Stichting Nationale Parken Bonaire (STINAPA).

Bonaire was part of the Netherlands Antilles until the country's dissolution in 2010, when the island became a special municipality (officially, a "Caribbean public body") within the country of the Netherlands. It is one of three special municipalities in the Caribbean; the others are Sint Eustatius and Saba. 80% of Bonaire's population are Dutch nationals, and nearly 60% of its residents were born in the former Netherlands Antilles and Aruba.

Etymology 

The name 'Bonaire' is thought to be derived from the Caquetio word 'Bonay, meaning 'low country'. The early Spanish and Dutch modified its spelling to Bojnaj and also Bonaire. French influence, while present at various times, was never strong enough to make the assumption that the name means 'good air'. According to another theory, the name might be derived from the Spanish phrase "buen aire", which does mean 'good air', as the Spanish were the first Europeans to colonise the island.

History

Original inhabitants
The most accurate human remains on the islands, dating from 4500 B.C., were found in Curaçao. On different islands the most accurate are 4000 BP in Aruba and 3300 BP in Bonaire. These individuals are currently called by the term Archaic Indians. The Caquetío(arawak) Indians, a clan having a place in the Arawak language family, arrived at the islands from South America around 500 AD. Archeological remains of the Caquetio culture have been found at certain sites northeast of Kralendijk and near Lac Bay. Caquetio rock paintings and petroglyphs have been preserved in caves at Spelonk, Onima, Ceru Pungi and Ceru Crita-Cabai. The Caquetios were apparently a very tall people, for the Spanish name for the ABC islands was 'las Islas de los Gigantes or 'the islands of the giants'.

Spanish period 

In 1499, Alonso de Ojeda arrived in Curaçao and a neighbouring island that was almost certainly Bonaire. Ojeda was accompanied by Amerigo Vespucci and Juan de la Cosa. De La Cosa's Mappa Mundi of 1500 shows Bonaire and calls it Isla do Palo Brasil or "Island of Brazilwood". The Spanish decided that the three ABC Islands were useless because they did not have known metal deposits, and in 1515 the Caquetío were deported to work in the copper mines of Santo Domingo on the island of Hispaniola; the total number may have been between 500 and 2000.

Spain colonized Bonaire since 1499 for a period of approximately one century. Likewise, one of the oldest references to the name of the island is found in the archive of the Main Public Registry of the city of Caracas (Venezuela). A document dated December 9, 1595 specifies that Don Francisco Montesinos, Curate and Vicar of "las Yslas de Curasao, Aruba y Bonaire" conferred a power of attorney to Pedro Gutiérrez de Lugo, resident in Caracas, to collect from the Royal Treasury of His Catholic Majesty Don Felipe II, the salary that corresponded to him for his office as priest and vicar of the islands.

Remnants of Bonaire's indigenous population can be seen in some of the island's current inhabitants. In fact, the majority of the population is of mixed black and white descent, with minorities of Europeans (descendants of the Dutch) and Africans (descendants of slaves)

In 1526, Juan Martínez de Ampiés was appointed Spanish commander of the ABC Islands. He brought back some of the original Caquetio Indian inhabitants to Bonaire and Curaçao. Ampies also imported domesticated animals from Spain, including cows, donkeys, goats, horses, pigs and sheep. The Spaniards thought that Bonaire could be used as a cattle plantation worked by natives. The cattle were raised for hides rather than meat. The Spanish inhabitants lived mostly in the inland town of Rincon which was safe from pirate attack.

Dutch period

The Dutch West India Company was founded in 1621. Starting in 1623, ships of the West India Company called at Bonaire to obtain meat, water and wood. The Dutch also abandoned some Spanish and Portuguese prisoners there, and these people founded the town of Antriol, which is a contraction of Spanish al interior (English: inside). The Dutch and the Spanish fought from 1568 to 1648 in what is now known as the Eighty Years War. In 1633, the Dutch having lost the island of St. Maarten to the Spanish retaliated by attacking Curaçao, Bonaire and Aruba. Bonaire was conquered in March 1636. The Dutch built Fort Oranje in 1639.

While Curaçao emerged as a centre of the slave trade, Bonaire became a plantation of the Dutch West India Company. Salt became a major export product of the island; a small number of African slaves were put to work alongside Indians and convicts, cultivating dyewood and maize and harvesting solar salt around Blue Pan. Slave quarters, built entirely of stone and too short for a man to stand upright in, still stand in the area around Rincon and along the salt pans. The slave population grew in the 1710s when a famine and social unrest on Curaçao caused the Dutch to relocate a large number of slaves to Bonaire. Historically, Dutch was not widely spoken on the island outside of colonial administration; its use increased in the late 19th and early 20th centuries. Students on Curaçao, Aruba and Bonaire were taught predominantly in Spanish until the late 18th century when the British took Curaçao, Aruba and Bonaire; the teaching of Spanish was restored when Dutch rule resumed in 1815.

During the Napoleonic Wars, the Netherlands lost control of Bonaire twice, once from 1800 to 1803, and again from 1807 to 1816. During these intervals, the British had control of the neighbouring island of Curaçao and of Bonaire. The ABC islands were returned to the Netherlands under the Anglo-Dutch Treaty of 1814. During the period of British rule, a large number of white traders settled on Bonaire, and they built the settlement of Playa (Kralendijk) in 1810.

Emancipation 

From 1816 until 1868, Bonaire remained a government plantation. In 1825, there were about 300 government-owned slaves on the island. Gradually many of the slaves were freed and became freemen with an obligation to render some services to the government. The remaining slaves were freed on 30 September 1862 under the Emancipation Regulation. A total of 607 government slaves and 151 private slaves were freed at that time.

World War II
During the German occupation of the Netherlands during World War II, Bonaire was a protectorate of Britain and the United States. The American army built the Flamingo Airport as an air force base. After Germany invaded the Netherlands on May 10, 1940, authorities declared Martial law, and many German and Austrian citizens, as well as Dutch thought to be German sympathizers, were interned in a camp on Bonaire. Some of these remained in this camp for the war's duration, and others were transferred to new camps that were built on the mainland in the first year of the war. In 1944, Princess Juliana and Eleanor Roosevelt visited the troops on Bonaire.

Bonairean sailors made an above-average contribution during World War II. German U-boats tried to eliminate shipping around the Aruba and Curaçao refineries and thus eliminate the island's considerable fuel production for the Allies. Bonairean crewed ships also took part in these battles. Among the many, missing after the war, were the 34 Bonaireans who died on these ships (more than on the other islands of the then Dutch West Indies). During hostilities, the site where the Divi Flamingo Beach Resort & Casino now stands served as an internment camp for Germans and Austrians living in the Antilles, mainly because they were distrusted. There were fears they could have sabotaged the giant oil refineries on Aruba and Curaçao that were supplying paraffin to the Allied air fleet.

The camp was in operation from 1940 to 1947. In total, 461 people were interned during this period without trial, most of them completely innocent. Among them were Medardo de Marchena and also the photographer Fred Fischer, then still an Austrian citizen. Many German internees had just fled Nazi violence. But there were also German prisoners of war, some of whom remained after the war. In September 1943, the father of George Maduro, after whom Madurodam is named, asked Queen Wilhelmina to exchange his son for the German internees on Bonaire. The government did not grant the request. After the war, the empty barracks became Bonaire's first hotel: Zeebad.

Post-war
After the war, the economy of Bonaire continued to develop. The airport was converted to civilian use and the former internment camp was converted to become the first hotel on Bonaire. The Dutchman Pierre Schunck started a clothing factory known as Schunck's Kledingindustrie Bonaire, a partial solution for the large female surplus on the island. In 1964, Trans World Radio began broadcasting from Bonaire. Radio Netherlands Worldwide built two shortwave transmitters on Bonaire in 1969. The second major hotel (Bonaire Beach Hotel) was completed in 1962. Salt production resumed in 1966 when the salt pans were expanded and modernized by the Antilles International Salt Company, a subsidiary of the International Salt Company. Part of the facilities extend into the Caribbean Sea and form the popular dive site known as Salt Pier. The Bonaire Petroleum Corporation (BOPEC) oil terminal was opened in 1975 for trans-shipping oil.
Politically Bonaire formed part of the Netherlands Antilles from 1954 to 2010; it is now a special municipality within the Netherlands. In 2011 the island officially adopted the US dollar as its currency.

Dissolution of the Netherlands Antilles

On 10 October 2010, the Netherlands Antilles was dissolved. As a result, the government of the Netherlands assumed the task of public administration of the Caribbean Netherlands or BES Islands comprising Bonaire, St Eustatius and Saba. The three islands acquired new status as "special municipalities" (bijzondere gemeenten), making them part of the Netherlands itself, a form of "public body" (openbaar lichaam) as outlined in article 134 of the Dutch Constitution. Special municipalities do not constitute part of a province.

As a special municipality, Bonaire is very much like ordinary Dutch municipalities in that it has a mayor, aldermen and a municipal council, and is governed according to most Dutch laws. Antillean legislation remained in force after 10 October 2010, with the exception of those cases where Antillean law was replaced by Bonaire's municipal law. It was believed best for the island to not introduce the entire body of Dutch legislation at one time as it would cause confusion. Therefore, Dutch legislation is being introduced in stages. Bonaire retained its own unique culture while residents enjoy the same rights as Dutch citizens, including the right to vote in Dutch parliamentary elections in the Netherlands. Residents also have access to new or improved facilities and government benefits including, but not limited to, universal health care; improved health care facilities; better educational facilities with additional training for teachers, new teaching methods and new school buildings; social housing for low-income individuals and families; a centrally dispatched single police force, fire department and ambulance service. While the three islands are considered to be land of the Netherlands, they are not a part of the European Union, therefore not subject to European Union Law. They are considered to be an overseas country and territory.

Bonaire's non-governmental organization, Nos Ke Boneiru Bèk ("We Want Bonaire Back"), is against the current constitutional relationship with the Netherlands. With reference to Bonaire's 2004 referendum, the organization is of the opinion that such an arrangement was never the choice of the people. The Dutch Minister of Home Affairs and Kingdom Relations, Ronald Plasterk, replied to the organization confirming that only the "Island Councils in the Caribbean Netherlands have the authority to decide on holding a constitutional referendum, not the Dutch government." In response, the organization gathered more than 3,500 signatures in 2013 favouring a new referendum. In a letter to minister Plasterk, James Finies, chairman of Nos Ke Boneiru Bèk, requested a "new referendum under the right of self-determination". Plasterk responded by advising Finies that preparations for the evaluation of the public entity structure had begun for 2015, but a "possible change of the constitutional relations is not part of that evaluation". The new referendum took place on 18 December 2015. 65% of the turnout voted that they were not happy with the current relationship between Bonaire and the Netherlands.

Geography

Geologists believe that Bonaire was formed relatively recently. As the nearby continental shelf (now located near Montserrat, and the cause of the volcanic activity on that island) moved through the area, it forced a large mass of rock to the ocean surface and created the islands of the Lesser and Greater Antilles, including Bonaire. As the seabed rose a vast coral reef grew on what is now dry land. These corals were eventually exposed to air and perished, becoming surface limestone deposits over the millennia.

Vast amounts of coral skeletons may be seen along the shoreline and across the interior of Bonaire. The island is essentially a coral reef that has been geologically pushed up and out of the sea. This also resulted in the natural fringing reef system seen today, in which the coral formations start at the shoreline. Bonaire's tides are more affected by a combination of wind and low/ high-pressure systems than by the moon.

The northern end of the island is relatively mountainous, although its highest peak (Brandaris) is only . The southern part of the island is nearly flat and barely rises above sea level. A significant portion of this southern region is covered with sea water in process of evaporation for salt production. This area also contains Lac Bay with its large mangrove forest. The shoreline of Bonaire is dotted with lagoons and inlets, the largest of which is Goto Lake in the north. These lagoons and wetlands provide an excellent habitat for a wide variety of shorebirds.

Klein Bonaire, the small island in the sheltered lee of Bonaire, has the same geological history. While Bonaire has some hills and variations in altitude, Klein Bonaire's surface is quite level and just a few feet above high tide. Because the island is as yet undeveloped, the fringing reef system surrounding Klein Bonaire is truly pristine. The smaller island is entirely ringed with dive sites.

Washington Slagbaai National Park is an ecological preserve on the north side of the island. It has a complete view of the island.

Climate 
Bonaire has a warm, dry (though humid) and windy climate.

The humidity is very constant, averaging 76% and fluctuating between 85% and 66% on a daily basis. Bonaire lies outside the hurricane belt, though its weather and oceanic conditions are occasionally affected by hurricanes and tropical storms. This semi-arid climate is conducive to a variety of cacti and other desert plants.

Ecology

Bonaire is fringed by a coral reef which is accessible to divers from the shore along the lee side of the island (facing west-southwest). The entire coastline of the island was designated a marine sanctuary in 1979, an effort to preserve and protect the delicate coral reef and the marine life that depends on it. There are more than 350 species of fish and sixty species of coral living in Bonaire's reef. Boulder Star Coral (Montastraea annularis) is the most common coral, according to a 2011 survey. In 2011, biologists discovered a new species of jellyfish in Bonaire, the highly venomous Bonaire banded box jellyfish (Tamoya ohboya).

Bonaire is also famed for its flamingo populations and its donkey sanctuary. Flamingos are drawn to the brackish water of the island's lagoons, which harbors the shrimp upon which they feed. Bonaire is home to one of only four nesting grounds for the Caribbean flamingo. Located in the Pekelmeer in the southern part of the island, no human entry is permitted in this sanctuary. In the 16th century, Europeans introduced sheep, goats, pigs, horses and donkeys on Bonaire, and the descendants of the donkeys, goats, and pigs roam the island today.

Bonaire is also home to the ecologically vulnerable yellow-shouldered amazon parrot, Amazona barbadensis.

Environmental initiatives
The island of Bonaire has long been a leader in nature conservation and ecological responsibility. The national park foundation, Stichting Nationale Parken (STINAPA), was founded in 1962 for the purpose of actively protecting nature on the island. In 1969 STINAPA succeeded in establishing both the flamingo nesting sanctuary and Washington National Park, the first such nature preserves in the Caribbean. In 1979, the Slagbaai plantation was added to the park, now known as Washington Slagbaai National Park (WSNP). The Bonaire National Marine Park (BNMP) was also established in 1979. Lac Bay, Klein Bonaire, Pelkermeer, Slagbaai and Gotomeer are recognized as wetlands of international significance under the Ramsar Convention.

Due to a public-private sector partnership, programs are being developed to advance the local awareness and attitudes toward conservation and habitat preservation in order to proactively protect Bonaire's ecosystem. A new sewage treatment plant will contribute to protecting the reefs and the seawater quality. In March 2013 Selibon NV, the national garbage-processing plant, opened an environmental court where the general public can bring glass, cans, paper, scrap metal, cardboard, batteries, motor oil, cooking oil, electronics, mobile phones and textiles.

The island is environmentally aware and protective of its coral reefs, the diversity of its aquatic ecosystems, and the conservation of its many species and natural environments above and below the water. The island's government, businesses and residents are committed to recycling waste products, and making others aware of the importance and benefits. Divers and dive shops take part in collecting debris washed ashore and preparing it for recycling.

Bonaire gets a significant amount of its electricity from an array of twelve wind generators along its northeastern coastline which began operating in 2010. This renewable source now fills 40-45% of the island's electricity needs. Work continues in developing additional renewable sources of energy, including bio-diesel and solar, with the goal of becoming 100% reliant on renewables.

Washington Slagbaai National Park 

The entire northern tip of Bonaire is a protected nature reserve, the Washington Slagbaai National Park. The 6000-hectare park was established in 1969 as the first nature park in the Netherlands Antilles. It is home to a wide variety of habitats, such as the bocas (inlets), dunes on the north coast, salt pans, pos (springs) and mountain areas. The park is rich in birds and other animals, especially lizards, including iguanas. Within the park there are two areas recognised internationally as important wetlands under the Ramsar Convention: the Slagbaai salt marsh and Lake Gotom. The park is also of great cultural-historical importance, not least because of the plantations and the history of Slagbaai. At the entrance to the park is the Bonaire Museum. From the entrance there are several signposted walks. The park is easily accessible by car and mountain bikers are also welcome.

Bonaire National Marine Park 
The Bonaire National Marine Park is a legally protected underwater park surrounding the entire island and Klein Bonaire.

The park was established in 1979 with the support of the World Wide Fund for Nature and others, and is managed by the Foundation of National Parks Bonaire (STINAPA Bonaire). Off the coast is the island of Klein Bonaire. There are about sixty dive sites.

Klein Bonaire 

Off the coast of Kralendijk lies the island of Klein Bonaire. The island is 700 hectares in size, completely flat and only covered with small bushes and cacti. There are at least 76 species of plants and about 55 species of animals on the island. It is surrounded by a coral reef. The beaches on the north and west side are the most important nesting sites for sea turtles. There are also several salt pans or salt lakes on the island. Red flamingos feed there; Bonaire has one of the largest flamingo populations in the world. For this reason and for the pristine coral reefs and sea turtle nesting beaches, the island is protected as a wetland of international importance by the Ramsar Convention. With the growth of diving tourism on Bonaire, project developers wanted to build hotels on Klein Bonaire. Just before the turn of the century, the island was bought and safeguarded by the Island Territory of Bonaire with the help of the Netherlands, the World Wide Fund for Nature and other conservationists. Since 2001, Klein Bonaire has been a legally protected nature reserve. The island is accessible by boat for divers, snorkellers and day-trippers.

Lac 
The Lac (lake) is a shallow lagoon in the southeast of Bonaire. The 700 hectare area is surrounded by mangroves. The lake is part of the protected underwater park and has been designated an aquatic area of international importance under the Ramsar Convention. The bay is unique for the presence of seagrasses and mangroves. Part of the mangroves is virtually undisturbed due to limited accessibility, making it important as a resting area for bird species. Lac is an important resting and nesting area for many marine birds and invertebrates, including the queen conch or Karkó. This mollusk used to be found in large numbers here, but overfishing has largely eradicated the population. The area serves as a nursery for reef fish and is the feeding ground for the green sea turtle.

Pekelmeer 
Pekel Lake and the flamingo reserve (800 hectares) are part of the large aquatic area in the south-west of the island. Salt is still extracted from this area. It is also the most important feeding and living area for the flamingo. Depending on the season, between 2000 and 7000 flamingos can be found in this area. The flamingo reserve is the most important breeding site in the Southern Caribbean. The total population migrating between Bonaire and South America is estimated at 20,000 individuals. The flamingo places special demands on its environment (water quality, tranquillity) and is very sensitive to disturbance. The Pekelmeer and the flamingo reserve have been designated as a water area of international importance under the Ramsar Convention. Bonaire will continue to actively protect the flamingo, the symbol of the island.

Salt pans and caves 

Salt pans are salt lakes or inlets that are closed to the sea by a dead coral dyke. They have an important function because they ensure the collection and filtration of (rain) water. This prevents nutrients and soil particles from reaching the reef and causing damage to the corals. This function is especially crucial during heavy rainfall. The salt pans are also an important feeding ground for many waterbirds. Slagbaai, Gotomeer, Pekelmeer and the Klein Bonaire salt pans are aquatic areas of international importance in the context of the Ramsar Convention.

Bonaire has many dozens of caves. As a geological manifestation they give a picture of the oldest history of the island. In several places the caves have cave drawings made by the original inhabitants of Bonaire. Some caves are home to bats or the blind shrimp Typhlatya. Bats play a useful role in the ecosystem: they trap a large number of insects (including mosquitoes) or provide pollination of flowers, including cactus flowers. The greatest threat to bats is the destruction or disturbance of their roosts.

Geology 
Bonaire lies on the Caribbean Plate, a tectonic plate bounded by four other tectonic plates: the North American Plate, the Cocos Plate, the Nazca Plate and the South American Plate. Bonaire as an island was formed in the Tertiary when the Caribbean plate boundary (the volcanic arc that formed the Caribbean islands to the east) shifted eastward.

The geology of Bonaire is dominated by gently dipping carbonate rocks ranging in age from Cretaceous (≈90-100 million years ago (Ma)) to Miocene (≈5 Ma), which lie unconformably on a pre-Cretaceous igneous basement. Where the unconformity corresponds with sea-level erosion, caves are common.

Government

2010 referendum
Prior to the 2010 referendum, the Netherlands Antilles (comprising the islands of Curaçao, Bonaire, St. Eustatius, St. Maarten and Saba) were governed as a parliamentary democracy based on the Dutch system of government with free elections held every four years. Dissension about their political future resulted in four of the five islands advocating for separation from the Netherlands Antilles. Some of the island residents wanted autonomy while others wanted more integration.

In 2005 a conference was held by the governments of the Netherlands, Aruba and the Netherlands Antilles to discuss future constitutional reform and the dissolution of the Netherlands Antilles. In 2006, Sint Maarten and Curaçao chose autonomy, and Bonaire, St. Eustatius and Saba opted for a closer relationship with the Netherlands. Constitutional referendums and dismantlement of the Netherlands Antilles was scheduled to take place in 2010.

Bonaire's announced referendum scheduled for 26 March 2010 was canceled in February 2010. The governor of the Dutch Antilles, Frits Goedgedrag, decided to cancel it because it probably contravened international law since part of the population was barred from voting. European Dutch nationals were only allowed to vote if they arrived on the island before 1 January 2007. The referendum was postponed to September and then October 2010. Eventually the referendum was held on 17 December 2010, with 84% voting in favor of becoming part of the Netherlands. However, as the 35% voter turnout rate was below the required 51%, the results of the referendum were declared invalid.

Judicial Institution and Prison 
The Judicial Institution (JI) of the Dutch Caribbean (Justitiële Inrichting Caribisch Nederland), based on Bonaire, is located in Kralendijk. Since 10 October 2010, the centre has been under the responsibility of the Department of Judicial Institutions (DJI), the agency of the Dutch Ministry of Justice and Security for the execution of sentences and custodial measures. The Bonaire site is both a House of Detention and a Judicial Institution. Since 6 December 2010 there is capacity for 76 men, women and juveniles. The name in Papiamento is Institushon Hudisial Karibe Hulandes, Boneiru site.

Economy

Tourism 
Bonaire's economy is mainly based on tourism, taking advantage of its warm, dry climate and natural environment. The island caters to scuba divers and snorkelers, as the surrounding coral reefs are well preserved and easily accessible from the shore. Bonaire has been widely recognized for many years in the diving community as one of the world's best shore diving destinations.

Bonaire's Marine Park offers a total of 86 named dive sites and is home to over 57 species of soft and stony coral and more than 350 recorded fish species. Most resorts and hotels have an on-site dive shop, and other accommodations are affiliated with a dive operation. The license plates carry the logo Diver's Paradise (in English).

Lac Bay, in the southeastern part of the island, attracts wind surfers from around the world to Bonaire. The shallow Bay is on the windward side of the island, so trade winds are strong and constant. A barrier reef across the mouth of the bay allows windsurfers of all skill levels to select wave conditions they like. Lac Bay is one of the stops in the PWA Windsurfing Freestyle World Cup and has hosted the Prokids IFCA Championship. Five of the PWA's ten highest ranked freestyle windsurfers are from Bonaire: Kiri Thode, Amado Vrieswijk, Bjorn Saragoza, Tonky Frans and Taty Frans. In the northern end of Lac Bay is one of the best preserved mangrove forests in the Caribbean, which is popular for kayaking and snorkelling.

Bonaire is also a port of call for more than fifteen cruise lines who make more than eighty calls per season at the island. The total passenger capacity for cruise ships in Bonaire is about 185,000.

Tourism infrastructure in Bonaire is contemporary and offers a variety of types of accommodations including hotels, full-service resorts, a few small bed and breakfasts and self-catering vacation rentals of all kinds. Other tourist activities include kite-boarding, windsurfing, mountain-biking, hiking, sailing, charter fishing, boating and bird-watching. All-in-all tourist expenditures in Bonaire are estimated at $125 million per year.

Currency

In 2011 the BES Islands replaced their currency, the Netherlands Antillean guilder (: ANG, symbol: ƒ), with the US dollar rather than replacing it with the euro which is used in the European Netherlands. The decision was based primarily on the needs for tourism and trade. Most countries and territories in the Caribbean use the dollar as their currency or have a currency linked to the dollar as legal tender. The guilder was pegged to the US dollar for decades with an exchange rate of ƒ1.79 = US$1.00. Adopting the dollar put an end to the dual-currency payment system and foreign exchange charges. The guilder remained in use in Curaçao and Sint Maarten.

Taxes

The separate tax regimes for Bonaire, St Eustatius and Saba present a greater risk of double taxation or double exemption from taxes. In an effort to remove the risk, two plans were introduced. One plan prevents double taxation between the Netherlands (Europe) and the BES Islands while the other prevents double taxation between the BES Islands and third countries. The new regime will generate a total annual tax revenue estimated at $52 million which is equal to the current tax revenues on the three islands. The combined population of the three Islands is approximately 20,000 with about half that many being income-taxpayers.

Salt production 
Utilizing the naturally low-lying geography and traditional Dutch dike design, much of Bonaire's southern half has been made into a giant system of ponds and pools which evaporate seawater to produce salt. Presently operated by Cargill, Bonaire's solar salt works produces 400,000 tons of industrial grade salt per year. After collection, the salt is then washed and stored in pyramid-shaped piles roughly 50 feet in height, each containing approximately 10,000 metric tons of 99.6 percent pure salt. The salt facility operates its own pier where ships are loaded with salt destined for North American, European and Western Pacific markets. Bonaire's salt is used primarily in industry.

The large condensing ponds which ring the crystallizer basins, called the Pekelmeer, are a natural habitat for numerous species of brine shrimp which in turn feed flocks of hundreds of pink flamingoes and other migratory birds. This is the location of Bonaire's flamingo sanctuary.

Oil storage and shipment 
The Bonaire Petroleum Corporation (BOPEC) is a fuel oil storage and transshipment terminal on Bonaire. BOPEC is wholly owned by Venezuelan oil company PDVSA, and functions primarily as a storage facility for multiple grades of refined and non-refined oils from Venezuela and refineries on Curaçao and Aruba. BOPEC also has mixing and blending capabilities for its stored fuels. BOPEC's #1 pier can receive tankers up to 500,000DWT, which means there are only seven ships in the world that are too big for the BOPEC terminal. A fire at the BOPEC terminal in 2010 is believed to have had a significant impact on Goto Lake and at least one other nearby lagoon.

Plantations and plantation houses 
In 1868 and 1870, a large part of the government land was auctioned and sold. These included five lots for forestry and livestock farming and nine lots for salt exploitation. The buyers of these large lots were mainly wealthy people from Curaçao, successful merchants, who had no intention of living on their plantations. There are no real plantations on Bonaire. The climate and soil conditions on Bonaire are not very favourable for the cultivation of fruits and vegetables of any size. Only salt extraction is economically attractive. In addition, on some "plantations" aloe cultivation (last exported in 1973), maize cultivation (due to drought there was not enough harvest every year), charcoal burning and cattle breeding (mainly goats, last exported in 1970) were carried out.

In the early 20th century, Bonaire's middle class was also able to buy plantation land. On Curaçao, the land house served as the main house of a plantation, where the owner lived. In the immediate vicinity were outbuildings, barns, stables and corrals. Surrounding it were the slave dwellings. On Bonaire, the plantation houses became the owners' cottages, where they stayed during the weekends. Often during the week there was an overseer (vito) who supervised the work on the plantation.

Transportation

Bonaire's first airport was located near Tra'i Montaña Subi Blanku and crossed the current path of Kralendijk to Rincon and was built in 1936. The airport proved to be too small when American soldiers arrived on Bonaire in the second half of 1943. The commander stated that a new airport had to be built. Construction began in December 1943, with the new "Flamingo Airport" opening in 1945. A small terminal was built that was suitable for the number of passengers at the time. This building was used until mid-1976. The airport had received many extensions of both the runway and the terminal itself.

Today the airport is known as Flamingo International Airport and is served by a variety of both domestic and international airlines. Services from the US include Delta Air Lines, American Airlines and United Airlines. Airlines providing European service include TUI Netherlands and KLM. Consistent air service from Curaçao is available through Divi Divi Air and EZ Air.

The airport is equipped with a fire station, control tower and hangar. Plans are underway for modifications to the current airport facilities, runway and the fire station.

Settlements

The two towns on the island are Kralendijk (the capital) and Rincon.
Kralendijk has many suburbs/neighbourhoods, although on an island with such a small population, the distinction is not always clearcut.

The town of Kralendijk is a result of a merger of five villages: Antriol (Entrejol), Nikiboko, Noord Saliña, Playa, and Tera Kora. The town of Rincon is the only other town.

Labra, Ishiri, Kokorobi, Jan Doran, Vlijt, Rigot, Porto Spano and Kunchi were several smaller towns that had existed in the national park but were later abandoned.

Demography 
The population is estimated to be 20,104 in 2019. Most of its inhabitants are of African descent, or mixed race, the product of European and African intermarriage, for whom the term "mulatto" is often used. However, a significant part of the population has a variety of origins, including the Netherlands, Dominican Republic, Venezuela, Colombia, Suriname and the United States, among others.

Main population centres 
The star on Bonaire's flag has six points, representing the six original settlements. Due to population growth and building expansion, five of them have grown together with the capital Kralendijk. Only Rincon, the oldest settlement on the island, located in the northern half, remained an independent village. In addition to these nuclei, a number of new districts have been added over the years. Behind Kralendijk, against the hill, are the Republiek and Santa Barbara districts. Behind Santa Barbara, on the coast, is the luxurious new district of Sabadeco (Santa Barbara Development Corporation). Beyond the airport, in the direction of the salt flats, is the neighbourhood of Belnem, named after Harry Belafonte. The population of as 2017 is distributed in the old towns and districts as follows:

 Kralendijk with a total of 10,620 inhabitants.
 Playa (centre of Kralendijk) with 2,571 inhabitants
 Tera Kora with 1,568 inhabitants
 Nikiboko with 3,058 inhabitants
 Antriol with 3,811 inhabitants
 Nort di Saliña with 1,217 inhabitants
 Rincon with 1,875 inhabitants

Religion 

Bonaire is predominantly Roman Catholic (68%), and there are also Protestant minorities. As in the rest of the former Netherlands Antilles, the predominant religion in Bonaire is Christianity, with the Catholic Church being especially important. Although the island passed from the rule of Catholic Spain to the Protestant Netherlands, Catholicism remained the principal island religion. Ecclesiastically, the churches on Bonaire depend on the Catholic diocese of Willemstad on the neighboring island of Curaçao.

After the discovery of Bonaire by Alonso de Ojeda in 1499, the spiritual life of the Christians was in the hands of the monks who came from Venezuela for baptisms. These missionaries belonged to the Jesuits of the Franciscan order. The first resident priest was Jacob Bernardus Eisenbel (Dutch), who came from Aruba to settle for several years in Bonaire and after whom the Parish of St. Bernard, the main Catholic church of the capital of Bonaire, Kralendijk, is named.

Rincon, Bonaire's second largest city, offers numerous regular festivals, including the annual Simadan (harvest) festivals and Dia di San Juan (St. John's Day).

Bonaire also has an Islamic centre and a Jewish community.

Education

Bonaire's educational system is patterned after the Dutch system. Early grades are taught solely in Papiamento, with more and more Dutch being introduced as the grade level progresses.

Scholengemeenschap Bonaire serves as Bonaire's secondary school, for ages 12–18.

Languages

As Bonaire is part of the Netherlands, Dutch is the official language, and the sole language for all administration and legal matters. However, as at 2017 it is the main language of only 15% of the population — around two thirds use the creole language of Papiamento as their main language.

In the 2001 census, Dutch was the main language of only 8.8% of the population. The most widely spoken language was Papiamento, the primary language of 74.7% of the populace and is recognized by the government. Spanish was the main language of 11.8% of the people, English the primary language of 2.8%, and other languages accounted for 1.8%. Bonaire is a polyglot society, with most of Bonaire's population able to converse in at least two of the languages of Papiamento, Dutch, English and Spanish.

Sports

Bonaire residents participate in numerous sporting events, including all the popular sports that attract tourists to the island such as scuba diving, sailing, fishing, boating, windsurfing, kite surfing, biking, baseball, association football, volleyball and tennis. There are multiple dive shops on Bonaire, most of which offer scuba instruction and PADI, NAUI, SSI and CMAS certification. The island's dive shops typically offer scuba tank and dive gear rental, boat diving excursions, snorkeling, kayaking, and naturalist classes. Some dive shops have gas blending stations, and offer tec diving instruction and excursions.

Bonaire hosted the PWA Bonaire World Cup 2014 and the 10th Prokids IFCA Championship 2014 at Lac Bay in Sorobon on the east side of the island. It is home to several professional windsurfing champions. The island is also home to the annual Bonaire Sailing Regatta, a national sailing competition and celebration that has been held every October in Playa. The event first began in 1967 when Captain Don Stewart challenged Hubert Domacasse to a race, wagering 27 cases of beer that his fishing boat "Sislin" was faster than Domacasse's fishing boat "Velia". The races are run between the leeward side of the island and Klein Bonaire.

The Bonaire Football Federation is a member of CONCACAF and the Bonaire Volleyball Federation is an associate member of CAZOVA (Caribbean Zonal Volleyball Association) and NORCECA. The Baseball teams play in the Caribbean region of Little league and Pony league. Bonaire was also confirmed as the 218th Table Tennis National association.

Media

Radio
Trans World Radio (TWR) first established its AM broadcasting site on the island of Bonaire in 1964 to broadcast Christian programs into Latin America and the Caribbean. The programs were broadcast in Spanish, Dutch and English. TWR-Bonaire began their operation with three transmitters, including a Brown-Boveri medium wave transmitter (500 kW over 800 kHz) and two shortwave transmitters (200 kW and 50 kW); however, their license to operate the 500 kW transmitter was revoked in 1999 thereby restricting broadcast to 100 kW. The Brown-Boveri medium wave transmitter was sold and removed from the island. It was replaced with another medium wave transmitter (PJB3-AM). In 2012, TWR-Bonaire was permitted to increase its power from 100 kW to 450 kW but in order to do so, they had to raise 38 million euros (US$43,456,610.00). In 2016 they commissioned Kintronic Labs to build a four-mast,  parallel-array directional antenna system. On January 31, 2018, they acquired a 450 kW Nautel Broadcast medium wave transmitter for US$3.8 million, and the name changed from Trans World Radio to Shine 800 AM.

Because of widespread availability of internet links providing higher audio quality and more flexibility, shortwave broadcasts by RNW-Bonaire were discontinued and at the end of October 2012, the radio station was closed and installations dismantled.

Bonaire has two island radio stations that broadcast general information: Bon FM and Radiodifucion Boneriano. The language spoken for both is Papiamento.

Internet and newspapers
There are several internet news sources including BES Reporter in English, Bonaire in Papiamento and Dutch, Bonaire Nieuws in Dutch, and Info Bonaire in English. The local newspapers, some of which are also available online, include The Bonaire Reporter in English, Extra and Boneriano in Papiamento, Bonaire Times in English, Spanish and Dutch, and two Dutch newspapers: Amigoe and Antilliaans Dagblad.

Television

Flamingo Television Bonaire B.V. offers cable programming and internet access via cable connection or fiber optics. Local and regional programming is offered in different languages including Papiamento, Spanish, Dutch and Chinese. English channels are made available through the efforts of a unified group of cable companies comprising the Caribbean Cable Cooperative Ltd.

Digital television programs and internet access are offered by Telbo N.V., a communication and media provider with an IP based infrastructure. They are the primary telephone service provider, and also offer various packages of high quality digital television programs with 130+ digital channels.

Residents of Bonaire receive some of Venezuela's main national television channels, all primarily in Spanish.

Symbols

Flag 
The flag, with the six-pointed star, symbolises a compass. The people of Bonaire were and are excellent fishermen and sailors. It is also said that the four points of the ring indicating East, West, South and North are intended to indicate that all people in the world are equal, regardless of where they come from. The red colour refers to the blood and the survivability of the people of Bonaire. Yellow represents the sun, the beach and the flowers of the Kibrahachi and the cactus. White represents peace and internationalisation. Blue represents the sea. The flag has not existed for a long time. It was only on 11 December 1981 that the design was approved, to which the whole population was able to contribute and give its opinion.

See also 

*

Notes

References

External links 

Breathe Bonaire – Live webcams from Bonaire (including the first megapixel underwater webcam)

 
Dependent territories in the Caribbean
Caribbean special municipalities of the Netherlands
Dutch-speaking countries and territories
Islands of the Netherlands Antilles
Slave cabins and quarters
Internment camps of the Dutch Empire